In Japanese, counter words or counters are measure words used with numbers to count things, actions, and events. Counters are added directly after numbers. There are numerous counters, and different counters are used depending on the kind or shape of nouns that are being described.

In Japanese, as in Chinese and Korean, numerals cannot quantify nouns by themselves (except, in certain cases, for the numbers from one to ten; see below).  For example, to express the idea "two dogs" in Japanese one could say 二匹の犬 ni-hiki no inu (literally "two small-animal-count POSSESSIVE dog"), or 犬二匹 inu ni-hiki (literally "dog two small-animal-count"), but just pasting 二 and 犬 together in either order is ungrammatical.  Here 二 ni is the number "two", 匹 hiki is the counter for small animals, の no is the possessive particle (a reversed "of", similar to the " 's" in "John's dog"), and 犬 inu is the word "dog".  

Counters are not independent words; they must appear with a numeric prefix.  The number can be imprecise: 何 nan or, less commonly, 幾 iku, can both be used to mean "some/several/many", and, in questions, "what/how many/how much".  For example, "some guests" can be translated as 何名様 nan mei-sama (lit. "some people-count honored-ones"), and "how many guests?" as 何名様？ nan mei-sama? (lit. "what people-count honored-ones QUESTION").  Some nouns prefer 幾 iku, as in 幾晩？ iku-ban? "how many nights?" and 幾日も行っていた iku-nichi mo itte ita "I was gone for many days."

Counter are similar in function to the word "pieces" in "two pieces of paper" or "cups" in "two cups of coffee". However, they cannot take non-numerical modifiers.  So while "two pieces of paper" translates fairly directly as 紙二枚 kami ni-mai (lit. "paper two flat-count"), "two green pieces of paper" must be rendered as 緑の紙二枚 midori no kami ni-mai, akin to "two pieces of green paper".

Just as in English, different counters can be used to convey different types of quantity. In English, one can say "one loaf of bread" or "one slice of bread". In Japanese, the equivalents would be パン一斤 pan ikkin (lit. "bread one-loaf") and パン一枚 pan ichimai (lit. "bread one-flat-count"). There are numerous counters, and depending on the kind or shape of nouns the number is describing, different counters are used.

Grammatically, counter words can appear either before or after the noun they count. They generally occur after the noun (following particles), and if used before the noun, they emphasize the quantity; this is a common mistake for English learners of Japanese. For example, to say "[I] drank two bottles of beer", the order is ビールを二本飲んだ bīru o nihon nonda (lit. "beer OBJECT two-long-thin-count drank").  In contrast, 二本のビールを飲んだ nihon no bīru o nonda (lit. "two-long-thin-count POSSESSIVE beer OBJECT drank") would only be appropriate when emphasizing the number as in responding with "[I] drank two bottles of beer" to "How many beers did you drink?".

Phrase structure involving numerals and counters 

In generative grammar, one proposed structure of Japanese nominal phrases includes three layers of functional projections: #P, CaseP, and QuantifierP.  Here, #P is placed above NP to explain Japanese's lack of plural morphology, and to make clear the # head is the stem of such morphology. This structure relies on movement in order to satisfy agreement via extended projection principle features.

Substitution of counters 
In Japanese, virtually all nouns must use a counter to express number because Japanese lacks singular/plural morphology. In this sense, virtually all Japanese nouns are mass nouns. This grammatical feature can result in situations where one is unable to express the number of a particular object in a syntactically correct way because one does not know, or cannot remember, the appropriate counting word. With quantities from one to ten, this problem can often be sidestepped by using the traditional numbers (see below), which can quantify many nouns without help. For example, "four apples" is りんご四個 ringo yonko where 個 ko is the counter, but can also be expressed, using the traditional numeral four, as りんご四つ ringo yottsu.  These traditional numerals cannot be used to count all nouns, however; some, including nouns for people and animals, require a proper counter (except for 1 and 2 people, which virtually always use variants of the traditional numerals; see exceptions).

Some of the more common counters may substitute for less common ones. For example, 匹 hiki (see below) is often used for all animals, regardless of size. However, many speakers will prefer to use the traditionally correct counter, 頭 tō, when speaking of larger animals such as horses. This yields a range of possible counters, with differing degrees of usage and acceptability – for example, when ordering kushikatsu (fried skewers), one may order them as 二串 futa-kushi (two skewers), 二本 ni-hon (two sticks), or 二つ futa-tsu (two items), in decreasing order of precision.

Counters may be intentionally misused for humorous, stupid, or insulting effects. For example, the phrase 男一匹  ("one man [like an animal]"), uses 匹 , the counter for animals, instead of the typical counters for people.

Table of traditional numerals

Common counters by category
This is a selective list of some of the more commonly used counting words.

Extended list of counters
This list also includes some counters and usages that are rarely used or not widely known; other words can also be used as counters more sporadically.

Euphonic changes
Systematic changes occur when particular numbers precede counters that begin with certain phonemes. For example, 一 ichi + 回 kai → 一回 ikkai. The details are listed in the table below.

This can be the result of the morpho-phonological phenomenon of historical sound changes,' as shown by the voicing of  匹 hiki:

六  + 匹 → 六匹

roku + hiki → 

six-small.animal.count

change from glottal [h] → bilabial [p].

It may also be that some counters carry features which are responsible for such euphonic changes for singular, dual, and plural nouns, where singular carries [+singular, -augmented] features, dual carries [-singular, -augmented] features, and plural carries [-singular, +augmented] features.

一人

hito-ri

one-person.count

二人

futa-ri

two-person.count

三人

san-nin

three-person.count

These changes are followed fairly consistently but exceptions and variations between speakers do exist. Where variations are common, more than one alternative is listed.

Jū is replaced by either ju- or ji- (じゅっ/じっ) followed by a doubled consonant before the voiceless consonants as shown in the table. Ji- is the older form, but it has been replaced by ju- in the speech of recent generations.

Exceptions
The traditional numbers are used by and for young children to give their ages, instead of using the age counter 歳 (or 才) sai.

Some counters, notably 日 nichi and 人 nin, use the traditional numerals for some numbers as shown in the table below. Other uses of traditional numbers are usually restricted to certain phrases, such as 一月 hitotsuki and 二月 futatsuki (one and two months respectively), 一言 hitokoto (a single word) and 一度 hitotabi (once).

Sometimes common numbers that have a derived meaning are written using different kanji. For example, hitori (alone) is written 独り, and futatabi (once more, another time) is normally written 再び instead of 二度. The counter for months kagetsu (derived from kanji 箇月) is commonly written ヶ月.

Nana and shichi are alternatives for 7, yon and shi are alternatives for 4, and kyū and ku are alternatives for 9. In those three pairs of options, nana, yon and  kyū respectively are more commonly used. Some counters, however, notably 人 nin (people), 月 gatsu (month of the year), 日 ka/nichi (day of the month, days), 時 ji (time of day) and 時間 jikan (hours) take certain alternatives only. These are shown in the table below.

While 回 kai (occurrences) and 銭 sen (0.01 yen, now rarely used) follow the euphonic changes listed above, homophones 階 kai (stories/floors of a building) and 千 sen (1000) are slightly different as shown below, although these differences are not followed by all speakers. Thus 三階 ("third floor") can be read either sankai or sangai, while 三回 ("three times") can only be read sankai.

Ordinal numbers
In general, the counter words mentioned above are cardinal numbers, in that they indicate quantity.  To transform a counter word into an ordinal number that denotes position in a sequence, 目 me is added to the end of the counter.  Thus "one time" would be translated as 一回 ikkai, whereas "the first time" would be translated as 一回目 ikkaime.

This rule is inconsistent, however, as counters without the me suffix are often used interchangeably with cardinal and ordinal meanings.  For example, 三階 sangai can mean both "three floors" and "third floor."

Periods of time
To express a period of time one may add 間 kan to the following words: 秒 byō, 分 fun, 時 ji, 日 nichi (and its irregular readings aside from tsuitachi), 週 shū, ヶ月 kagetsu and 年 nen. Usage varies depending on the word, though. For example, omitting kan in the case of 時間 jikan would be a mistake, whereas shūkan and shū are both in frequent use. In addition, kagetsukan is rarely heard due to essentially being superfluous, the ka already functioning to express the length.

Counter for Rabbits 
The counter for rabbits is -wa (羽), which is the same as the counter for birds species. Usually, -hiki  (匹) is used for “small-to medium-size animals ," therefore, the counter for rabbits is an exception. There are many theories about why -wa (羽) is used for rabbits instead of  -hiki (匹).

One of the theories is that in Edo-era, eating four-legged animals was strictly forbidden by the government, and people were not allowed to consume rabbit meat. Then, people started to categorize rabbits as birds so that they can consume rabbit meat, and the counter was also changed from  -hiki (匹) to  -wa (羽). Another theory is that taste of rabbit meat is similar to bird meat, and in addition, the rabbits were captured using a net just like birds so -wa (羽) is used instead of -hiki (匹). Takemitsu says that the origin of the word rabbit, 兎 (usagi), is 羽 (u) which describes birds feather: therefore, the counter, -wa (羽), is used for rabbits.

See also
 Japanese numerals 
 Japanese units of measurement
 Measure words
 Chinese classifier

References

External links
 About.com - Counters 
 A list of numeral counters with ichi/hito set indicated.

Counter words
Counter words
Counter word

ja:助数詞#日本語の助数詞